Telephlebia is a genus of dragonflies in the family Telephlebiidae,
endemic to eastern Australia.
Species of Telephlebia are medium to large, dark chestnut brown dragonflies with dark markings on the leading edge of their wings.
They are crepuscular and fly at dusk.

Species
The genus Telephlebia includes the following species:

Telephlebia brevicauda  – southern evening darner
Telephlebia cyclops  – northern evening darner
Telephlebia godeffroyi  – eastern evening darner
Telephlebia tillyardi  – tropical evening darner
Telephlebia tryoni  – coastal evening darner
Telephlebia undia  – Carnarvon evening darner

See also
 List of Odonata species of Australia

References

Telephlebiidae
Anisoptera genera
Odonata of Australia
Endemic fauna of Australia
Taxa named by Edmond de Sélys Longchamps
Insects described in 1883